Beat Breu (born 23 October 1957, in St. Gallen) is a Swiss former road bicycle racer. In 1982 Tour de France he won the prestigious stage on Alpe d'Huez, as well as another mountain stage finishing in Saint-Lary-Soulan, and finished sixth overall. He also won Tour de Suisse two times and a stage in 1981 Giro d'Italia.
In later life in 2019 he fulfilled his childhood dream of having his own circus.

In 2022 the National Museum of Switzerland made a miniature model of Breu's stage win up Alpe d'Huez in 1982.

Major results
Sources:

1981
 1st  Overall Tour de Suisse
1st Stages 3b & 7b
 1st Züri-Metzgete
 8th Overall Giro d'Italia
1st Stage 20
1982
 4th Overall Tour de Suisse
1st Stage 4b
 6th Overall Tour de France
1st Stages 13 &16
1983
 10th Overall Tour de Suisse
 10th GP du canton d'Argovie
1984
 6th Overall Tour de Suisse
1st Stage 2
 8th Overall Giro d'Italia
 8th Overall Tour de Romandie
1985
 5th Overall Tour de Suisse
 8th Overall Tour de Romandie
1986
 6th GP du canton d'Argovie
 9th Overall Tour de Romandie
1987
 6th Overall Tour de Romandie
1st Stage 4
1988
 1st  National Cyclo-cross Championships
 3rd  UCI Cyclo-cross World Championships
 7th Overall Tour de Romandie
1989
 1st  Overall Tour de Suisse
1st Stage 5b (ITT)
1994
 1st  National Cyclo-cross Championships

Grand Tour general classification results timeline

References

External links 
Profile by cyclinghalloffame.com
Palmarès by velo-club.org 

Swiss male cyclists
1957 births
Living people
Swiss Tour de France stage winners
Swiss Giro d'Italia stage winners
Tour de Suisse stage winners
Sportspeople from St. Gallen (city)
Cyclo-cross cyclists